"Falling in Love (Uh-Oh)" is the fourth single released by the American band Miami Sound Machine led by Gloria Estefan from their second English language album, and ninth studio album overall, Primitive Love.

Formats and track listings

Official versions and remixes
Original versions
 Album Version  — (3:56)

Pablo Flores remixes
 Single Remix  — (3:07)
 Extended Remix  — (6:07)
 Dub Version  — (5:18)

Release history

Chart performance

References

External links
gloriestefanmyspace
gloriestefanmexico.com
90millas.com

Miami Sound Machine songs
Gloria Estefan songs
1985 songs
1986 singles
Epic Records singles
Songs written by Lawrence Dermer
Song recordings produced by Emilio Estefan